James P. Holland (1865 - November 9, 1941) was president of the New York State Federation of Labor from 1916 to 1926.

Biography
He was a member of the Eccentric Firemen's Union of New York City. In 1913 he was the Grand Marshal of the New York City Labor Day Parade. As president of the New York State Federation of Labor he succeeded Homer Call of the International Butcher Workmen's Union of Syracuse, New York. Holland remained president from 1916 to 1926. He was succeeded by John Sullivan of the Brewery, Cereal and Soft Drink Workers' Union of New York City. He died on November 9, 1941 in New York City.

References

1865 births
American Federation of Labor people
1941 deaths
Trade unionists from New York (state)
Activists from New York City